Orobanche picridis is a species of plant in the family Orobanchaceae.

Sources

References 

picridis